Phyllis McCarthy (12 March 1903 – 16 February 1986) was a South African breeder of and authority on Rhodesian Ridgeback dogs. She established the Glenaholm Kennels in 1949 in Pietermaritzburg, South Africa, played a seminal role in the Ridgeback community and produced a long line of Ridgebacks featuring prominently in the ancestry of almost all modern members of the breed.

Biography
Phyllis was born on 12 March 1903, in Johannesburg, South Africa, the second of four children born to George Scarlet Abinger Keeling and Mabel Lydia Moorby, an accomplished painter, poet and composer. Her parents moved to Durban when she was quite young and it was here that she grew to early womanhood and married Victor McCarthy in 1925. They moved onto a large citrus farm (which they named Glenaholm) in Town Bush Valley just out of Pietermaritzburg and turned to raising poultry and a family of five children.

Her eldest son, Cuan McCarthy, became one of South Africa's best fast-bowlers and distinguished himself in Test matches against England.

McCarthy died on 16 February 1986, in Johannesburg, at the age of 82.

Breeding practice
Abandoning the Doberman Pinschers with which she had started, Phyllis McCarthy bought her first 2 RRs, Cleopatra of Efabe and Sheba of Efabe (SA3089 born 10.12.1948) and found they had most of the physical and temperamental qualities she sought. She next brought to bear her extensive knowledge of selective breeding acquired from her program of producing world-class poultry, and soon moulded her distinctive type of Ridgeback. During the 1960s she made use of an experienced geneticist flown in from England. She spent much time and effort attending dog shows throughout South Africa in order to study the top dogs that were available and to win champion status for her own dogs.  Glenaholm Kennels remain active under Lorraine Venter, Phyllis McCarthy's daughter.

Champions from Glenaholm

Southern African breeders of note (1900-1970)

Bibliography
Rhodesian Ridgeback Pioneers Linda Costa (Kantara investments, Australia 2004) 
The Complete Rhodesian Ridgeback Peter Nicholson & Janet Parker (Macmillan Publishing, New York 1991) 
The Rhodesian Ridgeback Indaba JN Murray (Privately published, Australia 1989) 
The Rhodesian Ridgeback Today Stig C Carlson (Ringpress Books, UK 1999) 
De Rhodesian Ridgeback in Nederland 1945-1991 PCR Geurts & JG Coppens (Rhodesian Ridgeback Club Nederland 1995) 
The Rhodesian Ridgeback - The Origin, History and Standard TC Hawley (Privately published, South Africa 1957-80)
Rhodesian Ridgeback Ann Woodrow (Privately published, England 1986) 
A Rhodesian Ridgeback Handbook JN Murray (Privately published, Australia 1996)

External links
Glenaholm official site
Short history of the Breed - Mylda Arsenis
History of the Breed - Sandra Piscedda
Pedigree search site

1903 births
1986 deaths
People from Johannesburg
South African people of British descent
Dog breeders
Animal care and training writers